Anthony Tucker (born February 27, 1976) is an American football coach and former wide receiver who is currently the offensive coordinator and wide receivers coach at Indiana.

Playing career 
Tucker played college football at Fresno State from 1994 to 1998 before signing with the New York Giants as an undrafted free agent in 1999. He was released by the Giants and signed with their practice squad multiple times over a period of two seasons before being loaned out to the Amsterdam Admirals of NFL Europe in 2001. Tucker was briefly a member of the St. Louis Rams in 2002 before he suffered a career-ending injury.

Coaching career 
Tucker began his coaching career at Lakewood High School in California at the request of one of his friends, who took over as the head coach of the football team. From there, Tucker went on to coach at Colorado as an offensive technical assistant before moving on to Idaho State to coach wide receivers. He also coached at Arkansas State before going on to joining the coaching staff at Maryland as running backs coach.

UCF 
Tucker was named the running backs coach at UCF in December 2017, on Josh Heupel's inaugural coaching staff. After being promoted to passing game coordinator in 2019, Tucker was named co-offensive coordinator in 2020, splitting coordinator duties with Alex Golesh.

Utah State 
Tucker was named the offensive coordinator and quarterbacks coach at Utah State in 2021. The move reunited him with Blake Anderson, who he worked under at Arkansas State.

Indiana
On February 18, 2023, Tucker was named co-offensive coordinator and wide receivers coach at Indiana.

References

External links 
 Anthony Tucker on Twitter
 Utah State Aggies bio

1976 births
Living people
Sportspeople from Orange County, California
People from Los Alamitos, California
Players of American football from Colorado Springs, Colorado
Players of American football from California
Coaches of American football from Colorado
Coaches of American football from California
American football wide receivers
Fresno State Bulldogs football players
California State University, Fresno alumni
New York Giants players
Amsterdam Admirals players
St. Louis Rams players
High school football coaches in California
Colorado Buffaloes football coaches
Idaho State Bengals football coaches
Arkansas State Red Wolves football coaches
Maryland Terrapins football coaches
UCF Knights football coaches
Utah State Aggies football coaches